The following table shows the world record progression in the women's 20 kilometres walk, as recognised by the IAAF.

World record progression

References
Athletix
IOC-site

Walk, 20 km women
Records